Gonçalo Batista Franco (born 17 November 2000) is a Portuguese professional footballer who plays as a midfielder for Moreirense.

Club career
Born in Porto, Franco finished his youth career at Leixões S.C. after joining its academy at the age of 13. He made his LigaPro debut with the first team on 4 January 2020, featuring 83 minutes in a 0–1 home loss against F.C. Penafiel.

Franco signed a five-year contract with Primeira Liga club Moreirense F.C. in the summer of 2020. He played his first match in the competition on 20 September, coming on as a late substitute in the 2–0 home victory over S.C. Farense. He scored his first goal the following 10 May, closing the 2–1 away defeat of Portimonense SC.

Personal life
Franco's father, Pedro, was also a footballer. A defender, he too represented Moreirense.

Career statistics

References

External links

2000 births
Living people
Portuguese footballers
Footballers from Porto
Association football midfielders
Primeira Liga players
Liga Portugal 2 players
Boavista F.C. players
FC Porto players
Rio Ave F.C. players
Leixões S.C. players
Moreirense F.C. players
Portugal youth international footballers